Mabrya coccinea is a mat-forming herbaceous perennial native to the Mexican state of Coahuila. It has red tubular flowers. It was first described by Ivan M. Johnston in 1950 in the genus Maurandya and transferred to Mabrya by Wayne J. Elisens in 1985. The epithet coccinea means red.

References

coccinea
Plants described in 1950